Agrotechimpex is an agricultural technology company in Mongolia.  It was established as the Department of Agricultural Material and Technical Supply under the Ministry of Agriculture in 1959, and privatized in a series of moves between 1996 and 1999.

At present Agrotechimpex company is the biggest agricultural material and technical supply company in Mongolia.

International and domestic cooperation
Besides its domestic clients, Agrotechimpex has working relationships with such government agencies as the Ministry of Agriculture and Food of Mongolia, State Reserve Authority and State Veterinary Department.

Internationally, the company has established partnerships with companies from Belarus, China, Finland, India, Italy, Japan and Russia.  Agrotechimpex imports such products as Kubota, New Holland tractors and Nova and Sampo combines.

Agrotechimpex actively participates in implementation of aid projects by foreign governments. For example, Agrotechimpex Company acts as domestic Agent (subcontractor) for Japanese Government aid project KR-2 to supply tractors and combines for Mongolian farmers.

Business profile
Agrotechimpex is a key player in the important agriculture sector of the Mongolian economy.  The company's main business activities include:
 Supply of machinery and equipment including tractor and combines for agricultural production
 Supply of spare parts for those machinery and providing services for them.
 Supply of veterinary instruments and drugs
 Supply of fertilizers and pesticides
 Supply of other products and materials for the Mongolian agricultural sector

Additionally, the company has developed some small business activities such as wholesale and retail food trading, flour mills, and a mechanical workshop to support its main activities and to improve the income of its employees.

Agrotechimpex exports a wide range of domestic agricultural raw material such as cashmere wool, animal hides, and meat.

Domestic sales volume of the company fluctuates between $1 million and $1.5 million annually depending on the need of farmers to buy machinery in a given year.

Agriculture companies established in 1959
Agriculture companies of Mongolia
Business services companies established in 1959
1959 establishments in Mongolia